Mabuza is a Nguni surname popular in South Africa, Mozambique and Eswatini. Notable people with the surname include:

David Mabuza (born 1960), South African politician
Enos John Mabuza (1939–1997), South African politician
Kaizer Mabuza (born 1980), South African boxer
Njabulo Mabuza, Swazi businessman and politician
Qinisile Mabuza, Swazi judge
Richard Mabuza (born 1946), Swazi long-distance runner
Silence Mabuza (born 1977), South African boxer
Thabo Mabuza (born 1994), South African rugby union player

See also
Felicia Mabuza-Suttle, South African television personality

Bantu-language surnames